One frigate and one submarine of the French Navy have borne the name Danaé:

 , an  launched in 1927 and scuttled in 1942.

French Navy ship names